AIMAll is a multiplatform, quantum chemistry software package whose primary purpose is to perform quantitative and visual Atoms in Molecules (AIM) analyses. It requires molecular wave function files from ab initio or density functional theory calculations as input. AIMAll is typically used and cited in a few hundred peer-reviewed research articles per year.
The latest version 19.10.12 was released in 2019.

References

External links
AIMAll Website

Computational chemistry software